Canadian National Hotels was a hotel chain under control by Canadian National Railways. In addition to their own hotels, it acquired some from predecessor railway companies like the Grand Trunk Pacific Railway, Grand Trunk Railway and Ottawa, Arnprior and Parry Sound Railway. Some of their assets were later acquired by rival Canadian Pacific Hotels after 1988.

Surviving hotels

Fairmont Hotels and Resorts

 Château Laurier Ottawa, Ontario, 1923–1988 – Built for Grand Trunk Railway and now part of the Fairmont chain as Fairmont Château Laurier
 Jasper Park Lodge Jasper, Alberta, 1923–1988 – Built for Canadian National Railway and now part of the Fairmont chain as Fairmont Jasper Park Lodge
 The Macdonald Edmonton, Alberta, 1923–1988 – Built for Grand Trunk Pacific Railway and now part of the Fairmont chain as Fairmont Hotel Macdonald
 Hotel Vancouver Vancouver, British Columbia, 1939–1988 – jointly operated with CP Hotels 1939–1962. Now part of Fairmont chain as Fairmont Hotel Vancouver
 Queen Elizabeth Hotel Montreal, Quebec, 1958–1988 – now part of Fairmont chain as Fairmont The Queen Elizabeth with building owned by Ivanhoé Cambridge.

Delta Hotels
 The Bessborough Saskatoon, Saskatchewan 1928-1972 – now owned by Delta Hotels as Delta Bessborough
 Hotel Beauséjour Moncton, New Brunswick 1972-1988 – now owned by Delta Hotels as Delta Beauséjour with building owned by Legacy Hotels Real Estate Investment Trust

Others

 Newfoundland Hotel St. John's, Newfoundland and Labrador 1949–1982. (Old hotel was replaced by a new one that CN operated from 1982 to 1988. Sold off to Canadian Pacific Hotels in 1988.) and later operated as Fairmont Newfoundland; now part of Sheraton Hotels chain as Sheraton Hotel Newfoundland
 The Nova Scotian, Halifax, Nova Scotia, 1928-1988? - now operated by Westin Hotels
 The Charlottetown Charlottetown, Prince Edward Island, 1931-1980s - now owned by Rodd Hotels and Resorts and operated as Rodd Charlottetown
 Pictou Lodge Pictou, Nova Scotia, - originally built as Wentworth Lodge by The Bungalow Camps Company and auction to CNR in 1926; sold 1957 and now operates as independent Pictou Lodge Resorts
 The Fort Garry Winnipeg, Manitoba, 1923-1979 - Built for Grand Trunk Pacific Railway and now operated as an independent hotel
 Prince Arthur Hotel Port Arthur, Ontario, 1911-1988 - now independent hotel and resort
 L'Hotel, Toronto, Ontario, 1984–1988; later as Crowne Plaza Hotel and now as InterContinental Toronto Centre

Demolished hotels

 Highland Inn, Algonquin Provincial Park 1923-1932 – Built for Ottawa, Arnprior and Parry Sound Railway and later owned by CN Rail (1923–1931) and last owned by Government of Ontario; dismantled and burned 1957; area was reforested with red pine
 Grand Beach Hotel, Grand Beach, Manitoba, – built by Canadian Northern Railway, opened 1916. Operated by lessee in later years of Canadian National ownership until 1961; hotel gone sometime after 1961 and area known as Grand Beach Provincial Park. The site is now a wooded area of Point Grand Marais.
 Minaki Lodge, Minaki, Ontario 1923-1950s; Built for Grand Trunk Pacific Railway and later sold to Government of Ontario; main lodge burned down 2003 and site is now subject to future re-development
 Prince Edward Hotel, Brandon, Manitoba 1916–1949 – demolished, later used for parking and now site of Kristopher Campbell Memorial Skateboard Plaza

See also
 Canada's grand railway hotels
 Canadian Pacific Hotels 1886-2001
 Grand Trunk Railway Hotels 1912-1923
 Fairmont Hotels and Resorts 2001–present

References
 Canadian National Railways
 Pictou Lodge Resorts
 Fort Garry Hotel
 Rodd Charlottetown
 Prince Arthur Waterfront Hotel and Resort
 A Walking Tour of Brandon

 
Fairmont Hotels and Resorts
Hotel chains in Canada
Lists of hotels in Canada